Oktar Cirit (1946–16 February 1976) was a Turkish diplomat who was assassinated by ASALA while he was the First Secretary at the Turkish Embassy in Beirut.

Assassination
In 16 February 1976, Cirit was shot from his back with a suppressed pistol while he was in Hamra street in Beirut. Assassin ran away with his vehicle. ASALA claimed the responsibility of the attack.

A funeral organized in Turkish Embassy on 19 February 1976 and his coffin sent to Ankara, the capital of Turkey.

Also see
 List of Turkish diplomats assassinated by Armenian militant organisations
 Ministry of Foreign Affairs (Turkey)

References

20th-century Turkish diplomats
1946 births
1976 deaths
Assassinated Turkish diplomats
Deaths by firearm in Lebanon
Turkish terrorism victims